Martin Růžek, born Erhard Martin (23 September 1918 – 18 December 1995) was a Czech actor. He starred in the film Poslední propadne peklu under director Ludvík Ráža in 1982.

Personal life 
Růžek was born on 23 September 1918 in Červený Kostelec. He died on 18 December 1995 in Prague.

Selected filmography
 Anna Proletářka (1950)
 Princezna se zlatou hvězdou (1959)
 The Night Guest (1961)
 Death is Called Engelchen (1963)
 Hvězda zvaná Pelyněk (1964)
 Happy End (1966)
 Lidé z maringotek (1966)
 Lupič Legenda (1972)
 Do Be Quick (1977)
 Poslední propadne peklu (1982)

References

1918 births
1995 deaths
Czech male film actors
Czech male stage actors
Czech male television actors
People from Červený Kostelec
20th-century Czech male actors
Czechoslovak male actors